Aboncourt may refer to one of the following places in France:

 Aboncourt, Meurthe-et-Moselle, a commune of the Meurthe-et-Moselle département
 Aboncourt, Moselle, a commune of the Moselle département
 Aboncourt-Gesincourt, a commune of the Haute-Saône département
 Aboncourt-sur-Seille, a commune of the Moselle département

See also
 Abancourt (disambiguation)
 Auboncourt-Vauzelles, a commune in the Ardennes 'department